The German Alpine Club (DAV for short) is the world's largest climbing association and the eighth-largest sporting association in Germany. It is a member of the German Olympic Sports Confederation and the competent body for sport and competition climbing, hiking, mountaineering, hill walking, ice climbing, mountain expeditions, as well as ski mountaineering. It is an association made up of local branches known as 'sections'.

History
It was founded in order to promote the development of tourism in the Eastern Alps through the building of mountain huts, and establishment of hiking trails, and via ferratas. The association had a large membership from the beginning, attracting 1,070 members in the first ten months.

The German and the Austrian societies merged in 1873 to form the German and Austrian Alpine Club (DÖAV). By the late 19th century, the association's policies became increasingly nationalistic and anti-Semitic. In 1899, the Brandenburg section amended an "Aryan paragraph" to exclude non-Christian members, followed by the Vienna section in 1905 and the Alpine associations of Vienna in 1907 and Munich in 1910. After World War I, Jewish members, including Viktor Frankl and Fred Zinnemann, who made up one third of the membership, were banned in most branches. They, in turn, established a separate Donauland section, insisting on recognition by the DÖAV. The Donauland members were officially ousted in 1924. Jews were even banned from using the DÖAV mountain huts.

Following Austrian Anschluss to Nazi Germany in 1938, the DÖAV, under the leadership of Arthur Seyss-Inquart, was renamed as the Deutscher Alpenverein (DAV) and was incorporated into the Nationalsozialistischer Reichsbund für Leibesübungen (National Socialist League of the Reich for Physical Exercise) as its mountaineering association. After World War II, the DAV was dissolved by the Allied authorities. Its assets were held by the Austrian Alpine Club, acting as trustees.

The German Alpine Club was re-established in 1952. After leaving the Union Internationale des Associations d'Alpinisme in 2008 due to differences of opinion regarding competitive and recreational sports, the German and Austrian Alpine Clubs rejoined the Union Internationale des Associations d'Alpinisme in 2013.

Structure

The DAV is an umbrella organization comprising 358 legally independent regional sections with a total of around 1.3 million  members. Every branch is a registered voluntary association (Eingetragener Verein, e.V.) in its own right and solely responsible for admitting members. The collective body of the branches is represented by the general assembly, association council, and presidium.

The primary task of the Club is the maintenance of its mountain huts through its sections which currently provide 321 alpine club huts for hikers and mountaineers as well as 207 indoor climbing gyms. The DAV publishes Alpine Club maps and Alpine Club Guides in cooperation with Bergverlag Rother, organises hill walks and alpine-style tours, makes mountaineering equipment available to rent and arranges collective insurance. It also runs the Alpine Museum on Prater Island in Munich. In recent years, the Club's policies have shifted towards habitat conservation, with a particular focus on the protection of the fauna and flora of the Alps.

References

Sources 
 Anneliese Gidl: Alpenverein. Die Städter entdecken die Alpen. Der Deutsche und Österreichische Alpenverein von der Gründung bis zum Ende des Ersten Weltkrieges. Böhlau, Wien u. a. 2007, . (Rezension)
 Holt, Lee Wallace. Mountains, Mountaineering and Modernity: A Cultural History of German and Austrian Mountaineering, 1900-1945. ProQuest, 2008.
 Nicholas Mailänder: Im Zeichen des Edelweiß. Die Geschichte Münchens als Bergsteigerstadt. Zürich 2006.
 Rainer Amstädter: Der Alpinismus. Kultur, Organisation, Politik. Wien 1996.

External links 

 Official website of the German Alpine Club
 Overview of the branches of the DAV
 Official website of the youth division of German Alpine Club (JDAV)
 Alpinism in the Hitler State
  The Danube land affair of the DuOeAV: The darkest chapter of our club history (select: Donaulandaffäre)

Sports organisations of Germany
Alpine clubs
Nature conservation organisations based in Germany
Hiking organisations in Germany
Sports clubs established in 1869
Mountaineering in Germany
1869 establishments in Bavaria
Hiking governing bodies
Deutscher Naturschutzring